The Challenge Desgrange-Colombo was a season-long road bicycle racing competition between 1948 and 1958. There were two classifications, one for individual cyclists and another for nations.

History
The Challenge Desgrange-Colombo competition was created in 1948 to get the cyclists from two of the most dominant countries of the sport, France and Italy, to participate in each other's races. Named after long-time Tour de France director Henri Desgrange and Giro d'Italia director , the competition was organised by the newspapers L'Équipe, La Gazzetta dello Sport, Het Nieuwsblad-Sportwereld and Les Sports. It marked early co-operation between L'Équipe and La Gazzetta dello Sport which lasts to this day.

Riders' performances in the Tour de France, Giro d'Italia, Milan–San Remo, Paris–Roubaix, Tour of Flanders, La Flèche Wallonne, Paris–Brussels, Paris–Tours and the Giro di Lombardia counted towards the competition. The Tour de Suisse was added in 1949, Liège–Bastogne–Liège in 1951, the Vuelta a España in 1958.

The first winner was Belgian Briek Schotte, who won the Tour of Flanders and also world road race championship of the 1948 season. The 1949 edition was won by the Italian Fausto Coppi while 1950 went to the Swiss Ferdi Kubler and 1951 to Frenchman Louison Bobet. Kubler also won in 1952 and 1954 to equal the record of Belgian Fred De Bruyne, who won from 1956 to 1958.

The competition was effectively superseded by the Super Prestige Pernod, first awarded in 1959.

Winners

References

Bibliography

External links

 
Cycle racing series
Recurring sporting events established in 1948
Recurring events disestablished in 1958
Defunct cycle racing series